(MUS) (English: Sovereign Union Movement) was a Puerto Rican political party.  The party was founded in October 2010 in the city of Caguas, Puerto Rico.

Certification
On March 20, 2012, the Puerto Rico State Commission on Elections (CEE) certified the MUS as a registered party after obtaining the 60,000 endorsements required by Puerto Rican Electoral law.

Election results

The MUS is currently a small third party.  Its candidate for Governor of Puerto Rico, lawyer Arturo Hernández, came in fifth place in the 2012 elections with 0.56% of the vote; María de Lourdes Guzmán, the MUS's candidate for Resident Commissioner, also finished fifth with 0.62% of the vote.  The MUS failed to win any seats in the Puerto Rican Senate or House. Also, since the party did not receive 3% of the vote in 2012 to remain as a certified party, it was de facto dissolved.

References

Political parties in Puerto Rico
Political history of Puerto Rico
Political parties established in 2010
2010 establishments in Puerto Rico